Don't Look Back is the first extended play (EP) by Filipino band Lola Amour. The EP consists of four original tracks.

Background
In 2017, after winning the Wanderband, an annual battle of the local independent bands of Wanderland Music and Arts Festival, Lola Amour released their debut EP, titled "Don't Look Back".

"Don't Look Back" was released on 16 May 2017 at Mow's Bar, Quezon City.

Track listing

References

2017 debut EPs